M87 or M-87 may refer to:

Military
 M87 machine gun, a Yugoslav copy of the NSVT machine gun
 M-87 Orkan, a Yugoslav rocket-artillery vehicle

Transportation
 Tumansky M-87, a Soviet aircraft engine
 M-87 (Michigan highway), a former state highway in Michigan, US
 McDonnell Douglas MD-87, a passenger airplane

Other uses
 Messier 87, a giant elliptical galaxy in the Virgo Cluster
  M87*, a supermassive black hole at Messier 87's core
 M87 Ray (α and β), the signature move of the character Zoffy from the Ultra Series of television shows; See List of Ultraman Ginga characters
 "M87", the theme song for the 2022 film Shin Ultraman by Kenshi Yonezu.